Daniil Rapoport (1970 – 14 August 2022) was a Latvian American investor, financial executive, and outspoken critic of Russian president Vladimir Putin. His death from a fall from his high rise apartment building in Washington, D.C. is regarded as suspicious.

Early life and education
Rapoport was born to a Jewish family in Riga, Latvian Soviet Socialist Republic (now Latvia) around 1970. Both of Rapoport's grandfathers, Jewish and Latvian, served in the Cheka. In 1980, his family received political asylum and emigrated to the United States, settling in Houston, Texas. He graduated from the University of Houston in 1991, in 2015 he earned an MBA from Middlesex University in London.

Career

Finance 
After graduating from the University of Houston, Rapoport returned to Russia employed by Phibro Energy. He worked as a financial analyst for the first Russian American joint venture for oil production, White Nights Joint Enterprises, which was based in Raduzhny, Siberia. After leaving Phibro, Rapoport remained in Russia, working in corporate finance, brokerage and investment banking. He held senior positions with several Russian financial institutions and completed various cross border transactions representing Russian companies and various international institutional investors. In 1995, Rapoport joined the CentreInvest Group and in 1999 was appointed Managing Director of CentreInvest Securities, in New York. From 2003, he served as the Executive Director and head of the brokerage business in Moscow for CentreInvest Securities, a brokerage specializing in mid cap equities.

Soho Rooms 
Rapoport was known for being coowner of the iconic Moscow nightclub Soho Rooms. "A table started at ₽100,000 Rubles ($3,300 USD), Cristal champagne flowed like a river, and Timati, VIA Gra and the best foreign DJs performed on stage."

In 2017, Rapoport's business partner and coowner of Soho Rooms, Sergey Tkachenko, also died from a suspicious fall from his apartment window. He was filmed  dangling from the open window of a 19th floor apartment in the Presnensky District of downtown Moscow. In the footage shot by a passerby on the street below, he is seen clinging to the window frame while his girlfriend attempts to pull him back from inside the room, before losing his grip and plunging to his death. Tkachenko had left active management of Soho Rooms four years prior to embark on a DJ career, had just opened his own club, Mir, in the downtown Moscow, and was engaged to be married. The death was purportedly the result of a dispute between Tkachenko and his girlfriend.

Soho Rooms closed in April 2017, with employees reporting that the club remained profitable but "times had changed."

Legal issues
In 2008, while based in Moscow, Rapoport was charged by the U.S. Securities and Exchange Commission (SEC) with an alleged violation of Section 15(a) of the Securities Exchange Act of 1934. The SEC claimed that the alleged infraction occurred while he was Managing Director of CentreInvest Securities in Moscow and indirectly oversaw the activities of CentreInvest Inc. in New York. Unable to serve Rapoport with due notice at his Moscow location, the SEC in 2009 entered a default judgment. Once aware of the default judgment, Rapoport responded by filing a motion under Exchange Rule 155 (b) to vacate the judgment. After several court decisions, in 2012, the Court of Appeals for the District of Columbia Circuit, Judge David B. Sentelle presiding, unanimously granted Rapoport's petition to vacate, quoting the SEC's failure to consistently apply its own rule.

Life in the United States and Ukraine
In June 2012, Rapoport returned to the United States. It was reported that he left Russia in large part due to his support for Russia's democratic opposition, particularly his support for Alexei Navalny, an outspoken yet tolerated campaigner against Russian corporate and government corruption and the most vocal critic of Putin's regime. In that same year, he founded Rapoport Capital.

In 2016, Rapoport divorced his first wife, Irina, a fashion model with whom he had two kids. Soon thereafter he relocated to Kyiv, Ukraine where he met and married his second wife, Alyona, a virologist from Kyiv, together they had a daughter. The couple remained there until Russia's invasion of Ukraine in 2022. 

In a divorce settlement finalized in October 2016, Irina Rapoport became the sole owner of the Washington DC property she and Dan had owned together - a mansion on Tracy Place in the Kalorama district of Washington, DC. On 4 January 2017, Irina sold the Kalorama property to Tracy DC Real Estate, a corporation formed on 15 December 2016  and controlled by Chilean billionaire and mining magnate Andronico Luksic Craig. The sale of the Kalorama mansion made headlines after it was revealed that Jared Kushner and Ivanka Trump would be Luksic's new tenants.

In 2018, the investigative organization Bellingcat reported that Rapoport created the pen name David Jewberg, who was regularly quoted in Ukrainian media as a senior Pentagon analyst.

Death
On the evening of 14 August 2022, Rapoport was found on the street in Washington D.C. outside 2400 M Street NW in the city's West End, a 9-story high rise luxury apartment building from which he had fallen to his death. According to the Metropolitan Police Department of the District of Columbia there is no suspicion of foul play and it is initially thought to be a suicide; the police are waiting on a medical examiner's report that could take up to 90 days. "I think the circumstances of his death are extremely suspicious," says Bill Browder. "Whenever someone who is in a negative view of the Putin regime dies suspiciously, one should rule out foul play, not rule it in." David Satter said about the case "Nothing adds up ... everything we do know is very, very strange." Fiona Hill remained wary, telling Politico "Not every unexplained death in Russia is the KGB or the GRU bumping someone off." Rapoport's wife denied it could have been a suicide. Ilya Ponomarev said Rapoport seemed depressed to him, but didn't seem suicidal. A friend in Washington, Yuri Somov, said he thinks the suicide story is plausible. According to Somov, Rapoport told him that it had "been a very difficult three months", which Somov observed, "From him, particularly, that's saying a lot. More than notable, it was extraordinary."

On November 16, 2022, the DC Office of the Chief Medical Examiner confirmed that Rapoport died after falling from a height, but did not conclusively explain the circumstances leading up to his death. The DC Metropolitan Police Department told Radio Free Europe/Radio Liberty that they had ended their investigation but provided no explanation for the death.

See also
 Mikhail Lesin
 2022 Russian businessmen mystery deaths

References

1970 births
2022 deaths
Soviet emigrants to the United States
American investors
Businesspeople from Moscow
University of Houston alumni
Russian businesspeople in the United States
American people of Latvian-Jewish descent
21st-century American Jews
21st-century American businesspeople
Businesspeople from Riga